Lake Beauclair is a  lake in the central part of the U.S. state of Florida. It is part of the Lake Harris Chain of Lakes (along with Lake Dora and Lake Carlton) within the Ocklawaha River watershed. In 2012 a dredging project was conducted to improve water quality.

References

External links
Lake Dora Eco Summary
Lake Beauclair news

Beauclair
Beauclair